Richard Gaddes (born 23 May 1942) is an English opera company administrator based in the United States.

Career in England
Gaddes was born in Wallsend, England.  He studied at Trinity College of Music in London.  At Wigmore Hall, London’s famed recital hall, he created a series of lunchtime concerts designed to give young musicians opportunities to perform. This introduced such artists as flute virtuoso James Galway and the soprano Margaret Price.

He formed his own artists management company, then joined Artists International Management, a company which represents musicians worldwide, including Beverly Sills and conductor John Pritchard, then music director at the Glyndebourne Festival Opera. On one of John Crosby's regular visits to London to hear new singers for the Santa Fe Opera, a summer opera company in Santa Fe, New Mexico which Crosby directed, Gaddes helped him with the audition process. By December 1968, Crosby suggested the possibility of a job in Santa Fe, and from the 1969 season, he became its Artistic Administrator.

Initial career at Santa Fe Opera
Given his knowledge of the British operatic and musical scene of the day, Gaddes was instrumental in spotting the talent of Kiri Te Kanawa and bringing her to the Santa Fe Opera as the “Countess” in The Marriage of Figaro for her US debut during the 1971 summer season. (It was not until her Royal Opera House Covent Garden triumph in December of that year that she achieved international stature). During this period as Artistic Administrator, he introduced artists other than Te Kanawa; these included the conductor Edo de Waart and the mezzo Frederica von Stade (who was also a triumph in the 1971 Figaro). In addition, he was instrumental in arranging for the world premiere of Heitor Villa-Lobos' Yerma, which featured paintings by Giorgio de Chirico.

Opera Theatre of Saint Louis
Although Gaddes remained involved with the Santa Fe Opera, he left in 1976 to establish, as co-founder, Opera Theatre of Saint Louis and served as its General Director until 1987. Under his leadership, the company achieved international recognition for the development of young artists, the discovery of new singers given the opportunity to perform important roles, and the presentation of a varied repertory.  For example, in 1983, Opera Theatre of Saint Louis became the first American opera company to be presented at the Edinburgh International Festival.

As he notes in a 2001 interview, during this period Gaddes sought out and became instrumental in developing the careers of young singers: 

After leaving Opera Theatre of Saint Louis, Gaddes became President of Grand Center of St. Louis, a midtown performing arts district and served as its President until 1994.  He continues to serve on its Board.

Career resumption at Santa Fe Opera
Continuing as a consultant to The Santa Fe Opera's Apprentice Program for Artists from 1988 until 1994, he rejoined the company full-time in that year as Vice Chairman of the Capital Campaign for the planned new theater, the third on the original site. He was appointed Associate General Director of The Santa Fe Opera in 1995 and, in May 1998, was named the next General Director after John Crosby. He has held that post from 2000 until the end of the 2008 season.

As General Director in Santa Fe, Gaddes sought to bring to Santa Fe the most important singers, conductors, directors and designers from the US and abroad. He continued and broadened the Company’s long-standing commitment to the performance of new and unusual works. In 2003 he appointed Alan Gilbert as the Company’s first Music Director.  When Gilbert resigned the post in May 2007, Kenneth Montgomery became interim music director for the 2007 season.  In July 2007, SFO and Gaddes named Edo de Waart the company's new chief conductor, effective 1 October 2007.

Under Gaddes, SFO expanded its community outreach programs. These have included a Fall community production and, in a first for the company, the multi-screen video simulcast of Natalie Dessay’s performance in La sonnambula given in 2004 at the Fort Marcy Park. The video simulcast was repeated on 11 August 2007 with a performance of La bohème.

In August 2007, Gaddes announced that he was ready to retire and that he wished SFO to begin a search for his successor, adding that he would remain in the position until his successor as SFO General Director was found.  In November 2007, SFO announced that Charles MacKay would become the company's next General Director.  Gaddes' tenure as SFO General Director concluded with his retirement on 30 September 2008.

Additional career information
Gaddes is a former Vice President of Opera America. He has served on panels of the National Endowment for the Arts, the National Institute for Music Theatre (formerly the National Opera Institute), and as consultant for the William Matheus Sullivan Musical Foundation. He is an emeritus trustee of the board of the Pulitzer Arts Foundation and is a frequent judge at national and international voice competitions including the Metropolitan Opera National Council auditions.

Honors and awards
The recipient of numerous honors and awards, Gaddes has been cited by Mu Phi Epsilon music fraternity, St. Louis Chapter of the Public Relations Society of America Lamplighter Award, and as the first annual Missouri Arts Award honoree, the Human Relations Award of the St. Louis Jewish-American Committee, National Institute for Music Theatre Award and Young Audiences' Cultural Achievement Award. He has received honorary doctorates from St. Louis Conservatory and Schools for the Arts, University of Missouri and Webster University. He has been honored by the Mayor of Santa Fe for his contribution to the arts, and by New Mexico Business Weekly as one of the 2005 “Top 10 Power People in the Arts.”.  
Gaddes has also been a frequent juror for international voice competitions.

He was recognized for his services to the arts in New Mexico by proclamation by the governor of New Mexico making 16 September 2008 as "Richard Gaddes Day".

In November 2008, Gaddes was one of four recipients of the first National Endowment for the Arts's "Opera Honors Award" given at a ceremony in Washington, DC. The three other recipients were conductor James Levine, composer Carlisle Floyd, and soprano Leontyne Price.

References
Notes

Sources
 Huscher, Phillip, The Santa Fe Opera: An American Pioneer, Santa Fe, New Mexico: Sunstone Press, June 2006. 
 Scott, Eleanor, The First Twenty Years of the Santa Fe Opera, Santa Fe, New Mexico: Sunstone Press, 1976.
 Smith, Craig, "Success on the tightrope: Gaddes balances between the legacy and the future", The Santa Fe Opera - 50th Anniversary supplement to The Santa Fe New Mexican, 28 June 2006.
 The Santa Fe Opera − Miracle in the Desert, Santa Fe Opera Shop, 2003.

Opera managers
People from Santa Fe, New Mexico
People from Wallsend
Living people
1942 births
Alumni of Trinity Laban Conservatoire of Music and Dance